The 2009–10 Romanian Hockey League season was the 80th season of the Romanian Hockey League. Six teams participated in the league, and SC Miercurea Ciuc won the championship.

First round

Final round

Playoffs

Semifinals
SC Miercurea Ciuc - Progym Gheorgheni 12-1, 12-2 8-0
CSA Steaua Bucuresti - SCM Braşov 4-3 OT, 6-2, 5-2

Final
SC Miercurea Ciuc - CSA Steaua Bucuresti 3-2, 5-2, 4-2, 0-1, 2-3, 6-3

3rd place
SCM Braşov - Progym Gheorgheni 6-1, 4-3, 5-4 OT, 3-0

5th place
CSM Dunărea Galați - Sportul Studențesc București 8-3, 5-2, 5-6, 5-4

External links
Season on hockeyarchives.info

Romanian Hockey League seasons
Romanian
Rom